Amphidecta is a genus of satyrid butterfly found in the Neotropical realm.

Species
Listed alphabetically:
Amphidecta calliomma (C. & R. Felder, 1862)
Amphidecta pignerator Butler, 1867
Amphidecta reynoldsi Sharpe, 1890

References

Euptychiina
Butterfly genera
Taxa named by Arthur Gardiner Butler